Christopher Jaime (born March 20, 2004) is an American professional soccer player who plays as a midfielder for USL Championship club Las Vegas Lights via the Los Angeles FC academy.

Club career
Born in San Diego, California, Jaime began his career with U.S. Soccer Development Academy side Nomads SC. In 2019, Jaime joined the academy at Major League Soccer club Los Angeles FC. On May 5, 2021, it was announced that Jaime, along with three other academy players, had signed USL academy contracts with Los Angeles FC's USL Championship affiliate club Las Vegas Lights. The academy contract allowed Son to play with professionals while maintaining NCAA college soccer eligibility.

Jaime made his professional debut for Las Vegas Lights on June 19, 2021 against Orange County SC. He came on as a 62nd minute substitute as Las Vegas lost 3–1.

On August 25, 2022, Jaime signed a professional deal with Las Vegas for the remainder of the 2022 season.

Career statistics

Notes

References

2004 births
Living people
American soccer players
Association football midfielders
Nomads Soccer Club players
Las Vegas Lights FC players
Los Angeles FC players
USL Championship players
Soccer players from San Diego